Pastpresent is a compilation album by Irish folk group Clannad, released in 1989. It is a collection of selected songs recorded by the band from 1982 up to 1989, including two new songs exclusive to this release (until their inclusion on the 2003 remastered edition of Sirius) – "The Hunter" and "World of Difference".

Three singles were released to promote the compilation: "The Hunter", "In a Lifetime" (re-issue) and the band's only double A-side "Hourglass"/"Theme from Harry's Game". However, "Hourglass" does not appear on this compilation and was only available as a single until it was included on the 2-disc 1997 Netherlands compilation In a Lifetime: The Ultimate Collection "(BMG 74321 488072)" and then again on the 2020 compilation In a Lifetime.

A book of sheet music for all songs except "Stepping Stone" was also produced.

The album cover is a still image taken from the music video released for the single "The Hunter".

Track listing
 "Theme from Harry's Game" – 2:26
 "Closer to Your Heart" – 3:28
 "Almost Seems (Too Late to Turn)" – 4:48
 "The Hunter" – 4:53
 "Lady Marian" – 3:19
 "Sirius" – 5:34
 "Coinleach Glas an Fhómhair" – 5:56
 "Second Nature" – 3:19 (not on vinyl album)
 "World of Difference" – 4:00
 "In a Lifetime" (duet with Bono) – 3:07
 "Robin (The Hooded Man)" – 2:49
 "Something to Believe In" – 4:44
 "Newgrange" – 4:02
 "Buachaill Ón Éirne" – 3:07
 "White Fool" – 4:37
 "Stepping Stone" – 3:52 (not on vinyl album)

Charts and certifications

Weekly Charts

Certifications

Singles
 "The Hunter"
 "In a Lifetime" 1989 Re-release
 "Hourglass"/"Theme from Harry's Game" Double A-Side
 "Newgrange"

Book

Pastpresent is a sheet music book, published to coincide with the album and video of the same name. The book provides sheet music for all songs from the album except "Stepping Stone". The book is now out of print. Credits in the books vary depending on the edition, of which there are two.

Chapters
 "Theme from Harry's Game"
 "Closer to Your Heart"
 "Almost Seems (Too Late to Turn)"
 "The Hunter"
 "Lady Marian"
 "Sirius"
 "Coinleach Glas An Fhómhair"
 "Second Nature"
 "World of Difference"
 "In a Lifetime" (a duet with Bono)
 "Robin (The Hooded Man)"
 "Something to Believe In"
 "Newgrange"
 "Buachaill Ón Éirne"
 "White Fool"

Video

Pastpresent was released on both VHS and LaserDisc. The video for Pastpresent is still widely available online, but has not been republished by the record companies involved.

Scenes
 "Almost Seems (Too Late to Turn)" – opening sequence
 "Harry's Game"
 "An Mhaighdean Mhara"
 "Closer to Your Heart"
 "Something to Believe In"
 "Teir Abhaile"
 "Robin (The Hooded Man)"
 "Newgrange"
 "Hourglass"
 "Buachaill Ón Éirne"
 "The Hunter"
 "In a Lifetime"
 "Almost Seems (Too Late to Turn)" – closing sequence

Times vary between scenes, with the closing credits on some United States versions of the video showing the full track "Almost Seems (Too Late to Turn)" at the end.

References

External links

Clannad compilation albums
1989 video albums
1989 books
Music books
Live video albums
1989 greatest hits albums
1989 live albums